The men's long jump at the 2015 World Championships in Athletics was held at the Beijing National Stadium on 24 and 25 August.

In the finals were the defending champion Aleksandr Menkov, Olympic Champion Greg Rutherford and world leader Jeff Henderson, however world #2-4 Zarck Visser, Rushwahl Samaai and Marquis Dendy were unable to get out of the rounds.  Henderson was the top qualifier with an 8.36 automatic first attempt trial.  Three Chinese jumpers made the final at home.

The Chinese made a statement in the first round as both Wang Jianan and Gao Xinglong jumped 8.14 to share the lead.  Menkov jumped 8.02 to take the third spot while Rutherford, Henderson and four other jumpers were unable to land a legal jump.  In the second round, Henderson got a legal jump of 7.95, two feet below his best of the year, but it put him in 5th place for a moment, then Wang improved to 8.18 and Rutherford popped 8.29 to assume the lead.	
In the third round Henderson again missed the board.  Kafétien Gomis made 8.02 after two fouls, Fabrice Lapierre did 8.10 and Li Jinzhe did 8.09, suddenly the world leader was pushed into ninth place and had no more jumps left.  In the fourth round Rutherford put an exclamation point on his lead with an 8.41, but only Gomis was able to make a legal jump in the round.  Lapierre jumped 8.20 in the fifth round to move into second place and solidified that standing with an 8.24 in the final round. Having been hampered by injury in 2013, the victory completed the full set of outdoor titles for Rutherford, making him the reigning Olympic, World, European and Commonwealth Champion.

Records
Prior to the competition, the records were as follows:

Qualification standards

Schedule

Results

Qualification
Qualification: 8.15 m (Q) or at least 12 best performers (q).

Final
The final was started at 18:30

References

Long jump
Long jump at the World Athletics Championships